Wandeir Oliveira dos Santos (born 15 May 1980), better known as Wandeir, is a Brazilian former professional footballer who played as a forward.

Club career
Wandeir was born on 15 May 1980 in Morada Nova de Minas, Brazil.

Wandeir started his career with popular Brazilian team Cruzeiro as a young boy from 1998 when he got in the team to 2002. After great performances he was bought by Macedonian team Cementarnica 55 who he helped in 2003 to win the Macedonian Cup. After six months with the club he moved to title contenders Skopje's FK Vardar which he helped them in 2007 to win the Macedonian Cup as he did for Cementarnica 55 four years before. Ahead of the 2005–06 season, he joined Kickers Offenbach, newly promoted to the 2. Bundesliga, but later returned to Vardar. Later he was transferred to Portuguese team Naval. In 2009, he came back to Macedonia to play for Rabotnički. From Rabotnički in 2011 he returned to Vardar and played 14 matches scoring 1 goal.

International career
After playing in Macedonia for five years, Wandeir took Macedonian citizenship and decided to play for the Macedonia national team. He was once called up for Macedonia but never played.

Honours
Cementarnica
 Macedonian Cup: 2002–03

Vardar
 Macedonian Cup: 2006–07

Rabotnički
 Macedonian Cup: 2008–09

References

External links
 Player profile on FK Rabotnicki web page
 
  at FootballPortugal.net

1980 births
Living people
Sportspeople from Minas Gerais
Brazilian emigrants to North Macedonia
Association football forwards
Brazilian footballers
Macedonian footballers
Cruzeiro Esporte Clube players
FK Cementarnica 55 players
FK Vardar players
Kickers Offenbach players
Associação Naval 1º de Maio players
CS Pandurii Târgu Jiu players
Varzim S.C. players
FK Rabotnički players
São José Esporte Clube players
Macedonian First Football League players
2. Bundesliga players
Primeira Liga players
Liga I players
Liga Portugal 2 players
Brazilian expatriate footballers
Macedonian expatriate footballers
Expatriate footballers in Germany
Macedonian expatriate sportspeople in Germany
Brazilian expatriate sportspeople in Germany
Expatriate footballers in Portugal
Macedonian expatriate sportspeople in Portugal
Brazilian expatriate sportspeople in Portugal
Expatriate footballers in Romania
Macedonian expatriate sportspeople in Romania
Brazilian expatriate sportspeople in Romania

Macedonian people of Brazilian descent